Onogur may refer to:

 Onogur, Bulgaria, a village in Dobrich Province
 Onogur Islands, Antarctica
 Onoğurs, members of a Hunno-Bulgar state around the Sea of Azov